Carlos Escarrá Malavé  (26 November 1954 – 25 January 2012) was a Venezuelan politician.

Career 
He served as attorney general of Venezuela and a member of the National Assembly of Venezuela for Aragua State, and was a member of the board of directors of the United Socialist Party of Venezuela (PSUV). He was a constitutional lawyer and a former judge for the Supreme Court of Venezuela. In August 2011, he was chosen as attorney general by lawmakers allied with President Hugo Chávez.

Escarrá died of a heart attack on January 25, 2012, and was replaced by Cilia Flores.

References

1954 births
2012 deaths
Members of the National Assembly (Venezuela)
United Socialist Party of Venezuela politicians
21st-century Venezuelan judges
20th-century Venezuelan lawyers
Government ministers of Venezuela
Fifth Republic Movement politicians
Communist Party of Venezuela politicians
Central University of Venezuela alumni
Attorneys general of Venezuela
Members of the Venezuelan Constituent Assembly of 1999